Jane Wilson-Howarth CF, BSc (hons), MSc (Oxon), BM, DCH, DCCH, DFSRH, FRSTM&H, FFTM RCPS (Glasg) (born 1954) is a British physician, lecturer and author. She has written three travel health guides, two travel narratives, a novel and a series of wildlife adventures for children. She has also contributed to anthologies of travellers tales, has written innumerable articles for non-specialist readers, and many scientific/academic papers.

Personal life
Jane Wilson was born in Epsom Hospital, Surrey, as one of the three children of Peggy (Margaret) Thomas (1926–2015), from London, and a bibliophile, Joe Wilson (1920–2011), from Ballymena in Northern Ireland. She grew up in Stoneleigh, a suburb just north of Ewell Village. She is married to Simon Howarth and the couple live between East Anglia and Kathmandu.

Education
She attended Stoneleigh East County Infants, Junior and Senior Schools, and also Cheam High School, but was challenged by dyslexia. She left school at 16 to study for an Ordinary National Diploma in sciences at Ewell Technical College (now North East Surrey College of Technology).

She then studied biological sciences at Plymouth Polytechnic, concentrating on invertebrates, pollution studies, environmental resource management, and completed a research project on cave microclimate and its influence on collembola. This involved countless trips into Radford Cave and led to her first publication. During cave exploration in the UK she made extensive collections of invertebrates to document the species living in lightless environments. In 1976 she was awarded a travelling scholarship by the Winston Churchill Memorial Trust, which funded a trip to Nepal.

The Nepal connection led to a veterinary research job and she wrote a thesis about rabbit parasites for an MSc from Corpus Christi College, Oxford. Through this work she developed both an interest in immunology and a plan to work to help the poor in emerging nations. She then studied for a medical degree at the University of Southampton.

She gained a Diploma in Child Health (Royal College of Physicians, London 1992), a Diploma in Community Child Health (Royal College of Physicians, RCGP and Public Health Faculty, Edinburgh 1992), a Diploma of the Faculty of Sexual and Reproductive Healthcare (Royal College of Obstetricians and Gynaecologists 2007) and a fellowship in the Faculty of Travel Medicine, Royal College of Physicians and Surgeons of Glasgow in 2009. She was also elected a fellow of the British Global and Travel Health Association in 2017.

Medical career
Since qualifying as a doctor of medicine, Wilson-Howarth has worked in general medicine and obstetrics and gynaecology in Swindon, orthopaedics in Salisbury and paediatrics at the John Radcliffe Hospital in Oxford. She was employed on various child survival and hygiene promotion projects in Sri Lanka, Pakistan, Indonesia, India and Nepal. Wilson-Howarth served as a National Health Service general practitioner (GP) in Cambridgeshire for over 15 years when she taught Cambridge medical students about general practice and also international health.

She lectures on travel health too and has contributed to numerous textbooks, and on occasion to health stories for national newspapers.
 She helped provide clinical care to Syrian refugees in Greece 
for Médecins du Monde / Doctors of the World in 2016. She works on occasion for Voluntary Service Overseas including in Nepal and also Nigeria.

Wilson-Howarth lived in Nepal from 1993 until 1998 and then moved back there in 2017 where she worked as a volunteer writing clinical guidelines for Nepali paramedics and mentoring clinicians in remote mountain villages through the charity PHASE (Practical Help Achieving Self Empowerment). She has also contributed material to the bilingual Covid19 Nepal Support website and she has articles about Covid-19 in the online Nepali newspaper Setopati.

Influences
Dervla Murphy, Eric Newby, Hilary Bradt, Gerald Durrell, David Attenborough, Joe Wilson (her father).

Sports and Expeditions
Wilson-Howarth started caving and also scuba diving while an undergraduate in Plymouth pursuing ecological studies. She did some cave diving and was probably the first woman to do decompression dives in the subterranean "lake" in Pridhamsleigh Cavern in Devon. In 1973 she won the British Universities and Colleges individual canoe slalom event and on the same day also the seven-mile whitewater canoeing race. In addition she won the national colleges sailing championship.
 
In 1978–79 she rowed for Corpus Christi College, Oxford, the first year the college had fielded a ladies eight, when they won three "bumps" in Eights Week. In 2004 she took the sport up again at Cambridge, rowing in various races on the River Cam and at Eton Dorney.

Wilson-Howarth spent six months on an overland trip to the Himalayan region; this was with a small team intent on finding new caves in Pakistan, India and Nepal and documenting what lived inside them. She began some research on histoplasmosis, on bat rabies and made extensive zoological collections mostly for the British Museum (Natural History) / Natural History Museum, London.

While an undergraduate at Southampton she was involved in further expeditions – to Madagascar and (leading a team of eleven) Peru. She also organised a medical elective with Save the Children in Ladakh. In 1983 she was awarded the BISH Medal by the Scientific Exploration Society for "courage and determination in the face of adversity".

The first Madagascar expedition led to a second, and this work contributed to the Ankarana Massif's recognition as an important refuge for mammals including the endangered crowned lemur, Sanford's brown lemur, as well as smaller wildlife and a previously unknown blind fish. The Massif also proved to be a rich location where important sub-fossil giant lemur remains were discovered.

Writing
{{quote box|The little propeller-driven plane droned along the line of the great Himalaya. The middle hills beneath us looked like a frozen, fathomless, choppy sea. Tossed as we were by turbulence and updrafts, we seemed as helpless and insignificant as a lost housefly buzzing over a threatening, deep-green ocean. Machhapuchharé, the fishtail, at nearly 7,000 metres, is as high as the highest Andean giants, yet from the air it looked tiny, overshadowed as it was by the Annapurna horseshoe, the tenth highest mountain in the world.|source=Jane Wilson-Howarth in A Glimpse of Eternal Snows”|align=right|width=40%}}Wilson-Howarth's writing almost invariably has a travel theme. Her first book (when she wrote as Jane Wilson), Lemurs of the Lost World (1990, 1995), is about expeditions to Madagascar and was described as the finest travel book thus far written about Madagascar by Dervla Murphy in the Times Literary Supplement. The Essential Guide to Travel Health has appeared in five editions having originally launched as Bugs Bites & Bowels in 1995. Your Child Abroad: a travel health guide is a family manual written in collaboration with paediatrician Dr Matthew Ellis. How to Shit Around the World is a compilation of toilet tales, and includes an introduction by Kathleen Meyer, author of How to Shit in the Woods.A Glimpse of Eternal Snows is a poignant travel memoirTo Live – and Die – with Dignity set in Cambridge and Nepal; it has received praise in the press; a second edition was published in the UK in October 2012 and the artist who designed the cover was featured on BBC TV earlier that year. A third edition was launched in India in 2015.A Glimpse of Eternal Snows was also chosen for The National Year of Reading and by BBC Radio Cambridgeshire for its A Book a Day project in May. Her first novel Snowfed Waters was self-published early in 2014 and then was launched in 2017 by the Delhi-based publisher Speaking Tiger. The book is a fictional sequel to A Glimpse of Eternal Snows.

Wilson-Howarth has contributed at literary festivals including twice at the Cambridge Wordfest and has contributed to several anthologies, mainly of travel writing.
 
She has written travel health features for most issues of Wanderlust (a total of over 200 articles so far) and also some for Condé Nast Traveller. She has occasionally contributed to The Independent newspaper and other national publications. In 2019, Simon Calder travel editor of the Independent newspaper called Wilson-Howarth one of the five most impressive travel authorities and was featured by Lonely Planet's on-line travel magazine.
She often gives talks and readings especially in East Anglia, and is a member of the Society of Authors as well as Cambridge Writers. Wilson-Howarth is also active in the innovative Walden Writers cooperative, set up in Saffron Walden, Essex, by authors Amy Corzine and Martyn Everett in 2008, to cross-promote the work of its members, organise literary events, publish a magazine and exchange information and support. Some meetings are workshops for members' works in progress, some tackle marketing and other matter that were once the domain of publishers. Other members include biographer Clare Mulley, children's authors Victor Watson, Rosemary Hayes and Penny Speller, and historian Lizzie Sanders. Amy Corzine, Rosemary Hayes, Victor Watson, and Wilson-Howarth collaborated on a feature on writing for children for Juno magazine.

Broadcasting
Wilson-Howarth has given television interviews on BBC Breakfast, ITV Tyne Tees and Sky Travel as well as on national Radio 4 programmes including Excess Baggage, Breakaway, The Living World and Medicine Now. She has also been 
interviewed live for radio programmes broadcast in the US, Canada, South Africa, Australia, Ireland and innumerable local radio stations. She has also contributed often to BBC Radio Cambridgeshire's Afternoon Show.

Bibliography
Travel Writing

Travel Health Guides
Wilson-Howarth, Jane (1995, 1999, 2002, 2006). Bugs Bites & Bowels republished as The Essential Guide to Travel Health'' (see below)

Novels

Contributions Published in Anthologies and on-line magazines

References

External links 
 Jane Wilson-Howarth author website
 
 
 Tribune review of the novel Snowfed Waters
 author blog
 Devon cave ecology paper 
 Walden Writers facebook page
 
 BBC Radio Suffolk interview with Jane Wilson-Howarth 
 Bradt Travel Guides page for Your Child Abroad e-book
 Bradt Travel Guides book page for A Glimpse of Eternal Snows
 Eifrig Publishing book page for Himalayan Kidnap
 Eifrig Publishing book page for Chasing the Tiger

Living people
1954 births
British travel writers
Alumni of Corpus Christi College, Oxford
Alumni of the University of Southampton
Alumni of the University of Plymouth
English non-fiction writers
British women travel writers
20th-century English medical doctors
20th-century British women writers
21st-century English medical doctors
21st-century British women writers
20th-century British medical doctors
21st-century British medical doctors
English children's writers
English women medical doctors
English memoirists
20th-century women physicians
21st-century women physicians
British women memoirists
20th-century English women
20th-century English people
21st-century English women